Cavasso Nuovo is a comune (municipality) in the Province of Pordenone in the Italian region Friuli-Venezia Giulia, located about  northwest of Trieste and about  northeast of Pordenone.

Cavasso Nuovo borders the following municipalities: Arba, Fanna, Frisanco, Meduno, Sequals.

People
Louis Francescon

References

Cities and towns in Friuli-Venezia Giulia